Helsinki Rockettes are a senior-level synchronized skating team from Helsinki, Finland, representing the figure skating club Helsingin Taitoluisteluklubi. They are one of the most successful teams in the world with three World Championships (2008, 2010 and 2011) and they are ten-time Finnish champions (across 1991–2012).

Helsinki Rockettes claimed their first World Championships medal, silver, in 2001. They won another silver medal as well as two bronze medals before capturing their first World title in 2008. They won their second World title in 2010, with Team Finland 2 Marigold IceUnity placing second. The pattern was repeated the following year in their hometown Helsinki in April 2011 when Rockettes became World champions for the third time.

History

The team was founded in 1984, thus being the first synchronized skating team in Finland. The name of the team was changed Rockettes in 1991, and then to Helsinki Rockettes in 2017. The team's long-time coach Kaisa Nieminen, with a skating background in Team Surprise, began working with Rockettes in 1997. Out of the 14 times that the World Championships have taken place, Helsinki Rockettes have represented Finland a total of nine times.

Programs

Competitive results (1999–2009)

Competitive results (2009–15)

References

External links 
 Official website of Rockettes

Senior synchronized skating teams
Sports teams in Finland
Figure skating in Finland
Sports clubs in Helsinki
World Synchronized Skating Championships medalists